This is a list of all sumo wrestlers whose pinnacle in the sport has been the fourth highest rank of komusubi and who held the rank in the modern era of sumo since the 1927 merger of the Tokyo and Osaka organizations.  There are usually two active komusubi. Wrestlers who went on to be promoted to sekiwake, ōzeki and yokozuna can be seen in the list of sekiwake, list of ōzeki and list of yokozuna articles.

The number of tournaments (basho) at komusubi is also listed. Wrestlers who won top division championships are indicated in bold. Active wrestlers (December 2022) are indicated by italics.

The longest-serving komusubi of modern times, who did not achieve further promotion, has been Fujinishiki Akira who held the rank for 10 tournaments.

List

* Wrestler held the rank on at least two separate occasions.

See also
List of past sumo wrestlers
List of sumo tournament top division champions
List of yokozuna
List of ōzeki
List of sekiwake

Notes

komusubi
Lists of sumo wrestlers
komusubi